The 484th Fighter-Interceptor Squadron is an inactive United States Air Force unit.  Its last assignment was with the 473d Fighter Group at K. I. Sawyer Air Force Base, Michigan, where it was inactivated on 16 February 1959.  During world War II, the squadron was activated as a replacement training unit, but never became operational.

History

World War II
The squadron was activated as the 484th Fighter Squadron in November 1943 at Grand Central Air Terminal, California, forming one of the three original squadrons of the 473d Fighter Group, The squadron was intended to become a Lockheed P-38 Lightning replacement training unit, but operated Bell P-39 Airacobras and other aircraft, and never became operational.  The squadron moved to Ephrata Army Air Base, Washington at the end of March 1944, along with other elements of the 473d Group. Upon arrival at Ephrata, the squadron was disbanded and its personnel used to form part of the cadre of the 430th AAF Base Unit (Replacement Training Unit, Fighter, Single Engine).

Cold War Air Defense
The 473d Fighter Group was activated again in 1956 by Air Defense Command to open K. I. Sawyer Air Force Base, and the 484th Fighter-Interceptor Squadron was activated as its operational squadron, authorized Northrop F-89 Scorpion aircraft. However, the squadron never received its aircraft and was inactivated before the runways at K.I. Sawyer were ready to receive operational aircraft.

Lineage
 Constituted as the 484th Fighter Squadron on 12 October 1943
 Activated on 1 November 1943
 Disbanded on 31 March 1944
 Reconstituted and redesignated 484th Fighter-Interceptor Squadron on 15 November 1955
 Activated on 8 June 1956
 Inactivated on 16 February 1959

Assignments
 473d Fighter Group, November 1943-31 March 1944
 473d Fighter Group, 8 June 1956 – 16 February 1959

Stations
 Grand Central Air Terminal, California, 1 November 1943
 Ephrata Army Air Base, Washington, 31 March 1944
 K. I. Sawyer Air Force Base, Michigan, 8 June 1956 – 16 February 1959

Aircraft
 Cessna AT-17 Bobcat, 1944
 Curtiss A-25 Shrike, 1944
 Bell P-39 Airacobra, 1944

References

 Notes

Bibliography

External links

484
Military units and formations established in 1943
1943 establishments in the United States